Supreme Court of Judicature may refer to:
 Supreme Court of Judicature (Barbados). Supreme Court of Barbados
 Supreme Court of Judicature (Guyana), Supreme Court of Guyana
 Supreme Court of Judicature (Ireland), the supreme court in Ireland from 1877 to 1920
 Supreme Court of Judicature, until 2009 the title of the superior court in Northern Ireland; see Courts of Northern Ireland
 Senior Courts of England and Wales, formerly known as "the Supreme Court of Judicature"
 Supreme Court of Judicature of Japan, existed from 1875 to 1946
 Court of Judicature of Northern Ireland, formerly known as "the Supreme Court of Judicature"

See also 
 Supreme Court of Civil Judicature (New South Wales)
 Supreme Court of Judicature at Fort William (Bengal)